The following is a list of rectors of the University of Buenos Aires, the largest and most prestigious university in Argentina, since its establishment in 1821.

Since August 2022, the rector of UBA is Dr. Ricardo Gelpi, former Dean of the Faculty of Medical Sciences.

List of rectors
Names in italics correspond to interventors appointed by the national government of Argentina.

Notes

References

External links
Full list of rectors at uba.ar  (archived)
"Rectores de la Universidad de Buenos Aires entre 1974 y 1983: Curricula Vitae, discursos y comunicados de prensa 

 
University of Buenos Aires
Academic staff of the University of Buenos Aires
Buenos Aires